The USL Super League (USLS) is a planned Division II professional women's soccer league in the United States. The league will be owned and operated by the United Soccer League. Originally planning to launch in August 2023, it is now slated to begin play in August 2024.

History
USL announced the formation of the Super League on September 21, 2021. Along with the pre-professional USL W League, which will start in 2022, the USLS is part of the creation of a full pathway for women's soccer. Amanda Vandervort, former Chief Women’s Football Officer for FIFPro, the global player’s association, was appointed League President on October 12, 2021.

In May 2022, United Soccer League announced that the Super League schedule will align with the "women’s international soccer calendar" with seasons running from August to June in order to "drive increased value." To attempt to avoid the worst of winter weather, a mid-season break is planned. The league hopes to field 12 teams in their inaugural season. On January 31, 2022, MLS club D.C. United reversed their decision in establishing a club for the inaugural USL W League 2022 season, instead reportedly looking to join the USLS in the future. On July 12, 2022, Santa Barbra Sky was announced as a USL expansion club, aiming to have a professional men's team in USL League One and a professional women's team. On July 14, 2022, the USL announced a partnership with USL NOLA, a group which aims to bring a USL Championship team to the city by 2025 and a USLS team to New Orleans, Louisiana in the future. On August 30, 2022, the USL announced that the JAXUSL ownership and executive group had acquired the rights to a USL Championship franchise in Jacksonville, Florida, to begin play by 2025 and a USLS team to begin play in the future. On October 18, 2022, USL Championship club Memphis 901 FC announced their intentions to construct a new soccer-specific stadium and accompanying training facilities that would host their men's team and a potential professional women's soccer team. On December 8, 2022, it was announced that USL League Two club Lane United FC acquired exclusive rights to pursue a Super League franchise in Lane County, Oregon.

References

Women's soccer leagues in the United States
Sports leagues established in 2021
2021 establishments in the United States
Professional soccer leagues in the United States
Professional sports leagues in the United States
United Soccer League